Rekat or Rikat or Rokat may refer to:
 Rekat-e Olya
 Rekat-e Sofla

Alternatively:
 Rekat may refer to the Turkish pronunciation of the Islamic term: Rak'ah